Nenjathai Allitha is a 1984 Indian Tamil-language romantic drama film directed by Ameerjan, starring Mohan, Naresh and Sadhana. It was released on 4 May 1984.

Plot 

Mohan and Naresh love Sadhana, while she loves Naresh only. The film has many twists which make Sadhana to accept Mohan's love, but Naresh resurfaces. The climax reveals who wins Sadhana's love.

Cast 
Mohan
Naresh
Sadhana
K. A. Thangavelu
Y. G. Mahendran
Typist Gopu

Soundtrack 
Soundtrack was composed by M. S. Viswanathan.

Reception 
Jeyamanmadhan of Kalki criticised the film for being too formulaic.

References

External links 
 

1980s Tamil-language films
1984 films
1984 romantic drama films
Films directed by Ameerjan
Films scored by M. S. Viswanathan
Indian romantic drama films